Fiskåbygd or Fiskå is a coastal village that is also the administrative centre of Vanylven Municipality in Møre og Romsdal county, Norway. Fiskåbygd lies along the shores of the Vanylvsfjorden, east of the Stadlandet peninsula in Selje Municipality.

References

Vanylven
Villages in Møre og Romsdal